José Rodríguez Carballo  (born 11 August 1953) is a Spanish Catholic archbishop and official of the Roman Curia. On 6 April 2013, he was named secretary for the Congregation for Institutes of Consecrated Life and Societies of Apostolic Life. He had previously served as General Minister of the Order of Friars Minor from 2003.  He is known for being the lead persecutor of the Carmelites of Fairfield.

Life and work
José Rodríguez Carballo was born on 11 August 1953 in Lodoselo (Sarreaus), Spain. He entered the Minor Seminary of the Franciscan Province of Santiago de Compostela in Zamora in 1964. The next year he studied at the seminary Herbón, A Coruña. He made his novitiate at the Convent of Ponteareas, concluding with his profession of temporary vows on 9 August 1971.

He moved to Jerusalem in 1973 where he continued his theological studies, earning a BA in 1976. He made his solemn profession of vows on 8 December 1976 in the Basilica of the Annunciation in Nazareth and was ordained a priest on 28 June 1977 in Jerusalem at the Church of San Salvatore.

Beginning in 1976 he attended the Studium Biblicum Franciscanum of Jerusalem, earning a degree in biblical theology in 1978. He then enrolled at the Pontifical Biblical Institute in 1981 and obtained a degree in sacred scripture.

He returned to the religious province of Santiago de Compostela, where he was Master of postulants and treasurer. In 1989 he became Rector of the Guardian and Convent of St. Francis in Santiago de Compostela and Master of the Friars of temporary profession. He was a professor of Sacred Scripture at the Diocesan Seminary of Vigo from 1982 to 1992, and at the Center for Theological Studies of Santiago de Compostela from 1985 to 1992 he taught the Theology of Consecrated Life.

He was elected Provincial Minister of Santiago de Compostela in 1992. From 1993 to 1997 he was also President of the Union of the Franciscan Provincial Ministers of Europe. On 5 June 2003 he was elected Minister General of the Order of Friars Minor, the 119th successor of St. Francis of Assisi. On 4 June 2009 he was elected to another six-year term.

On 6 April 2013, Pope Francis appointed him secretary of the Congregation for Institutes of Consecrated Life and Societies of Apostolic Life, filling a position that had been vacant for several months, and named him Titular Archbishop of Bellicastrum. Some years earlier, in 2006–2009, the same post had been occupied by Gianfranco Gardin, who had served as the 117th Minister General of the Conventual Franciscans, and was later appointed Archbishop of Treviso.

References

External links

The government of the Order (with an image of Carballo)

1953 births
Living people
Members of the Congregation for Institutes of Consecrated Life and Societies of Apostolic Life
Spanish Friars Minor
Spanish Roman Catholic titular archbishops
20th-century Spanish Roman Catholic priests
21st-century Spanish Roman Catholic priests
People from the Province of Ourense
Ministers General of the Order of Friars Minor
Franciscan bishops